Mt. Songak is a simple volcano on Jeju Island which has double craters and a parasitic volcano. Crater 1 is about 500 m in diameter, 1.7 km in circumference. Crater 2, the mouth of the volcano in Crater 1, is about 400 m in diameter, 69 m in depth and leans vertically.
 
From Sanyisu-dong to the summit and ridge of Mt. Songak there are various trails along the coast and on the volcano. Mt. Songak is one part of olle road route 10. Mt. Songak makes a shore cliff to the south, and the south part of crater forms a low and flat grassland in front of which lie slopes. Black and red volcanic ash still remain inside the crater.

There is little forest except some areas of planted pines. The volcano's soil is arid, and its ecosystem is very simple. Few plants grow in Mt. Songak because due to grazing on its fields. Typical plants are perennial Artemisia and broomrape.
       
Because the Japanese army occupied Mt. Songak to use as a steppingstone toward its invasion of China in World War II, there are remains of their presence including an airstrip and airship sheds. Under the shore cliff, there are still 15 trenches remaining from that era.

From the observation platform, the southernmost Marado (a.k.a. Mara Island) and Gapa islet look very close. Diverse fish such as sawedged perch and black porgy are caught here.

See also
Olle road
Marado
Hallasan
Jeju Uprising
Jeju Volcanic Island and Lava Tubes

References

External links
Jeju Special Self-governing Province
Jeju Tour Info
Jeju Olle Trail

Volcanoes of South Korea